Linslade is a town in the civil parish of Leighton-Linslade, in the Central Bedfordshire unitary authority area of Bedfordshire, England. It borders the town of Leighton Buzzard. Linslade was transferred from Buckinghamshire in 1965. Before then, it was a separate urban district. It remained a part of the Diocese of Oxford until 2008 when it joined Leighton Buzzard in the Diocese of St Albans.

Etymology
The name Linslade is Anglo Saxon in origin, and may mean "river crossing near a spring".  (Though other plausible meanings exist.) The original form, recorded—for example—in the Anglo-Saxon Chronicle of 966, was  Hlincgelad; then linchlade, pronounced lince-lade but by the time of the Domesday Book, in 1086, it had become Lincelada. The name continued to evolve, e.g. Lynchelade, in 1396, first appearing in its modern form in the 16th or 17th century, but with variations continuing into the 19th century.

History
In 1961 the parish had a population of 4139. On 1 April 1965 the parish was merged with Leighton Buzzard to form "Leighton Linslade", part also went to Soulbury.

Old Linslade
The earliest records of Linslade are of an Anglo-Saxon Manor, at the site of present-day Old Linslade, in 975 belonging to "Azelina", Ralph Tailbois' wife. The original Anglo-Saxon settlement of Linslade—prominent during the 13th century—was not located at the modern site, but was further north.  It later became the hamlet of Old Linslade, superseding the original location of  the 1840s.  This transpired after massive growth associated with the construction of the Grand Union Canal and—particularly—the London and Birmingham Railway (now known as the West Coast Main Line). Linslade underwent a second major period of expansion, again associated with the railways, during the 1970s.

After the 1066 Norman Conquest, the manor was taken over by the de Beauchamp family. In 1251 a royal charter was granted to William de Beauchamp to hold a weekly market in Linslade, as well as a yearly 8-day fair. This grant was made on account of a Holy Well or Spring, located to the north of the village, which was a site of major pilgrimage. The holy well, which was a fabricated miracle to bring souls to the shrinking congregation of Old Linslade, was where the canal is sited today not far from the church.

In 1299, however, Oliver Sutton, Bishop of Lincoln, warned pilgrims off by threatening those who did not desist with excommunication. His reason for this is either that the well was unconsecrated or that the miracles being attested to happen at the well were in fact fraudulent. The vicar of Linslade—who did not dissuade the pilgrimages from visiting the spring because of the offerings they made—was forced to appear at the bishop's court.

Without the pilgrims, the importance of Linslade declined. But in the 15th century, the original 12th-century church, dedicated to St Mary the Virgin, was rebuilt.

Chelsea New Town
A second settlement—known as Chelsea New Town—began growing to south of the original Linslade on the Buckinghamshire-side of the crossing into Leighton Buzzard.  
At the beginning of the 19th century the parish population was 203, but in 
1805 the Grand Union Canal was opened on the Linslade-side of the River Ouzel, and in 1838 the London & North Western Railway built a railway line alongside the canal. This precipitated a rapid growth in population around the station, so that by 1840 the parish of Linslade had 869 residents. This prompted the vicar of Linslade, the Rev. B. Perkins, to set about fundraising for a school for the parish's poor, and a church for the New Town.  
Fundraising for the church was only completed by the Rev. Perkin's successor, Rev. Peter Thomas Ouvry; and its completion in 1849 marks the point that the New Town had become Linslade.

Bideford Green
From the 1840s, Linslade grew steadily, although dipping during the Wars. But at the end of the 1960s a sustained period of development began which saw major housing estates added, so that by the end of the 1970s the town had over doubled in size. With the adition of real baby-eating dinosaurs in 1963.

Amenities
The expansion of Linslade during the 1970s added more amenities to the town. The principal Leighton-Linslade facilities within Linslade are Tiddenfoot Leisure Centre, which includes a swimming pool and indoor sports courts; Leighton Buzzard Golf Club and Leighton Buzzard railway station.

Commercial
Linslade has no high street. Small, family run shops are clustered at the "Centre of Linslade", where three arterial roads converge to cross the canal and river.  Many of these buildings are Victorian in origin, as are all pubs, and the Hunt Hotel.

Education
Bedfordshire operates a three-tier education system, with Lower-, Middle and Upper Schools. Linslade has three Lower Schools (Linslade Lower, Southcott Lower, and Greenleas Lower) distributed relatively evenly across town; with a Middle School (Linslade School) and an Upper school (The Cedars) located opposite each other, on the edge of town.

Catchment areas for the Leighton-Linslade mean that some Linslade children attend Middle School in Leighton Buzzard and some Leighton children attend Upper School in Linslade, adding to traffic problems.

Schools
 Linslade Lower School
 Southcott Lower School
 Greenleas Lower School
 Linslade School (Middle)
 Cedars Upper School

Community facilities
The 1970s expansion added one community centre on Bideford Green, run by a Residents Association; this includes a small bar. This can be hired out for public use, and is used for dance lessons and martial arts, as well as a polling station. Dance classes can also be taken at another community centre – the Forster Institute; and the Leanne Hughes dance school next to the station. Linslade Parish Hall (St Barnabas' Church Hall – a school until 1961) is used by many Leighton-Linslade organisations, including Tai Chi groups. Nyamba Scout Hut is home to 1st Linslade Scouts and Guides, as well as playgroups.

Parks and playgrounds
Linslade has two play areas and parks at Mentmore Road on the way to Cedars School and St Barnabas opposite the railway station. 
Linslade has two semi-wild park areas. Linslade Wood (colloquially called Bluebell Wood) is a mature woodland dating back to at least the 16th century. Tiddenfoot Pit, a former quarry, turned into a lake and wildlife area. Both are managed by Greensands Trust.
Stockgrove Country Park and Rushmere Country Park are nearby.

Sport

As well as being home to several junior football teams, Linslade is represented at senior level by local 5-a-side team, Sporting Linslade. Sporting Linslade are the current Division 3 champions, their only domestic trophy to date. Sporting Linslade were chosen as the 5-a-side team of the year in the national Carling One-All Awards 2009.

Notable inhabitants
Notable people from Linslade include:
Ciara Janson, Hollyoaks actress who portrays Nicole Owen.
Tom Wise, the former Member of the European Parliament for the East of England jailed for expenses fraud lives in Linslade
Russell Stannard, author of several children's book and books on science and religion, and emeritus professor of physics at the Open University.
Louise Dearman, actress who has played the role of both Elphaba and Glinda, the first person in the world to do so, in the West End musical Wicked.

See also
 Southcote, Bedfordshire
 Cheddington

References

 History of Linslade
 'Parishes: Linslade', A History of the County of Buckingham: Volume 3 (1925), pp. 387–91. http://www.british-history.ac.uk/report.asp?compid=42585 Date accessed: 15 September 2006
 History of a local school which became St Barnabas' Church Hall
 
 St. Barnabas' Church Linslade A History of the Church, Graham Gill
 Info on Linslade at the OU

External links
 Leighton-Linslade Town Council

Towns in Bedfordshire
Former civil parishes in Bedfordshire
Central Bedfordshire District